Enoch Chihana is a Malawian Member of Parliament for Rumphi Central. He is running under an Alliance for Democracy (AFORD) ticket in a highly contested by-elections held in the northern region district. The seat was formerly occupied by DPP's Moses Chirambo who died last year. He won the coveted seat by over 6,641 votes followed by DPP’s 3,275 votes. He is the Minister of Sports.

He is the son of the founder of AFORD, Chakufwa Chihana.

References

Living people
Alliance for Democracy (Malawi) politicians
Government ministers of Malawi
Members of the National Assembly (Malawi)
Sports ministers
Year of birth missing (living people)